Gláucio de Jesus Carvalho (born 11 November 1975 in São Paulo) is a Brazilian former footballer.

Football career

Netherlands and Brazil
Gláucio started his career at Portuguesa. He moved to Feyenoord in December 1994. He moved back to Flamengo for 1996 season. He moved back to Netherlands for Excelsior Rotterdam in November 1996. He played his last game in Netherlands for Feyenoord in September 1997. He then returned to Brazil again for Guarani and América (RJ).

Spain and Brazil
Glaucio played for Rayo Vallecano in La Liga for 2000–01 and 2001–02 season. He then played for Corinthians Alagoano.

Brazil and Asia
Glaucio moved to Qatari league in September 2003. After a short spell at Internacional and Paulista, he moved to Japan for Avispa Fukuoka in March 2005. He then back to Paulista, and signed a one-year contract with São Caetano in July 2007. In January 2008, he moved to Al-Salmiya and back to Brazil in July.

Glaucio moved to Oeste from Vitória in 2010 and retired as a professional player in May the same year.

International career
Gláucio played in 1995 FIFA World Youth Championship.

Club statistics

Qadsia Stats

References

External links

 Profile at VI
 CBF

1975 births
Living people
Brazilian footballers
Brazil under-20 international footballers
Brazilian expatriate footballers
Campeonato Brasileiro Série A players
Campeonato Brasileiro Série B players
Eredivisie players
Eerste Divisie players
La Liga players
Feyenoord players
Excelsior Rotterdam players
Rayo Vallecano players
Avispa Fukuoka players
Guarani FC players
CR Flamengo footballers
Paulista Futebol Clube players
Paraná Clube players
Associação Portuguesa de Desportos players
Sport Club Internacional players
Associação Desportiva São Caetano players
America Football Club (RJ) players
Esporte Clube Vitória players
J1 League players
J2 League players
Association football midfielders
Footballers from São Paulo
Al Salmiya SC players
Expatriate footballers in Kuwait
Expatriate footballers in the Netherlands
Expatriate footballers in Japan
Brazilian expatriate sportspeople in Kuwait
Kuwait Premier League players